Eduardo Etcheverry (unknown – unknown) was a Uruguayan chess player, Uruguayan Chess Championship winner (1962).

Biography
In the 1960s Eduardo Etcheverry was one of Uruguayan leading chess players. He won two medals in Uruguayan Chess Championship: gold (1962) and silver (1961). In 1963, in Havana Eduardo Etcheverry participated in Pan American Chess Championship and ranked in 10th place.

Eduardo Etcheverry played for Uruguay in the Chess Olympiad:
 In 1962, at second board in the 15th Chess Olympiad in Varna (+4, =2, -10).

References

External links

Eduardo Etcheverry chess games at 365chess.com

Year of birth missing
Year of death missing
Uruguayan chess players
Chess Olympiad competitors
20th-century chess players